Amendoim bravo is a common name for several plants and may refer to:

Euphorbia heterophylla, a weedy herb native to Central America and widely introduced in tropical regions
Pterogyne nitens, a South American tree